Diego Reynoso (born November 1, 1981 in Paraná (Entre Ríos), Argentina) is an Argentine footballer currently playing for Cobreloa of the Primera División in Chile.

Teams
  Colón de Santa Fe 2003-2005
  Atlético Rafaela 2005-2006
  Colón de Santa Fe 2006-2008
  Atlético Tucumán 2008-2009
  Olimpo de Bahía Blanca 2009-2010
  Sarmiento de Junín 2011
  Everton 2012
  Cobreloa 2013–present

References
 Profile at BDFA 
 

1981 births
Living people
Argentine footballers
Argentine expatriate footballers
Atlético de Rafaela footballers
Club Atlético Sarmiento footballers
Olimpo footballers
Atlético Tucumán footballers
Club Atlético Colón footballers
Everton de Viña del Mar footballers
Cobreloa footballers
Primera B de Chile players
Chilean Primera División players
Expatriate footballers in Chile
Association football defenders
People from Paraná, Entre Ríos
Sportspeople from Entre Ríos Province